"Dame Lo Que Quiero" ("Give Me What I Want") is the third single released from the debut album of the reggaeton duo R.K.M & Ken-Y, Masterpiece (2006).

Charts

References

2006 singles
R.K.M & Ken-Y songs
Spanish-language songs
2006 songs
Songs written by Rafael Pina